The 5th Nunavut Legislature began after the 2017 general election on October 30. The election returned 22 non-partisan members. In March 2019 the riding of Tununiq was vacated by the death of Joe Enook.

Change of premier
After the election, the Legislative Assembly of Nunavut met on November 17, 2017 to select Paul Quassa as the premier of Nunavut. Incumbent premier Peter Taptuna did not seek re-election.

Members

References

External links
 

5
Legislature, 5
Legislature, 5
Legislature, 5
Legislature, 5
Legislature, 5
Legislature, 5
2017 in Canadian politics
2018 in Canadian politics
2019 in Canadian politics
2020 in Canadian politics